Agnes Elizabeth Ell (married name Hurcomb; 19 January 1917 – 30 July 2003) was a New Zealand cricketer who played as a right-arm medium bowler. She appeared in one Test match for New Zealand, their first, in 1935. She played domestic cricket for Wellington. She was the sister of cricketer Jimmy Ell.

References

External links
 
 

1917 births
2003 deaths
Cricketers from Wellington City
New Zealand women cricketers
New Zealand women Test cricketers
Wellington Blaze cricketers